Charles Goldsborough (July 15, 1765 – December 13, 1834) served as the 16th Governor of the state of Maryland in the United States in 1819.

Early life
Goldsborough was born at "Hunting Creek", near Cambridge in Dorchester County, Maryland, and pursued an academic course.  He graduated from the University of Pennsylvania at Philadelphia in 1784 and began to study law.

Personal life
His daughter Maria married Virginia planter and politician William Henry Fitzhugh, son of patriot and planter William Fitzhugh.

Career
In 1790, he was admitted to the bar, and early on held several local political offices.  He was also a member of the Maryland State Senate from 1791 to 1795 and later from 1799 to 1801.

Goldsborough was elected as a Federalist to the Ninth and to the five succeeding Congresses, serving from March 4, 1805 to March 3, 1817.  In 1814 he was elected a member of the American Antiquarian Society. He later served as Governor of Maryland in 1819. In 1820, he retired from public life and moved to his estate near Cambridge.

Death and legacy
Goldsborough died at "Shoal Creek" near Cambridge, and is interred there at Christ Episcopal Church Cemetery.

Charles Goldsborough was the great-grandfather of Thomas Alan Goldsborough and Winder Laird Henry.

References

1765 births
1834 deaths
Governors of Maryland
People from Dorchester County, Maryland
University of Pennsylvania alumni
Federalist Party members of the United States House of Representatives from Maryland
Federalist Party state governors of the United States
Members of the American Antiquarian Society
People of colonial Maryland
Burials in Maryland
Goldsborough family